Fast and Loose is a 1930 American pre-Code romantic comedy film directed by Fred C. Newmeyer and starring Miriam Hopkins, Carole Lombard and Frank Morgan.  The film was written by Doris Anderson, Jack Kirkland and Preston Sturges, based on the 1924 play The Best People by David Gray and Avery Hopwood.  Fast and Loose was released by Paramount Pictures.

Other films or TV series with identical or similar titles, such as the 1939 MGM detective comedy starring Robert Montgomery and Rosalind Russell, are not related to this film.

Plot
The Lenox family of Long Island, headed by Bronson (Frank Morgan) and Carrie (Winifred Harris), is wealthy and respectful of tradition, but their children Bertie (Henry Wadsworth) and Marion (Miriam Hopkins) are more irreverent.  When Bertie gets involved with a chorus girl, Alice O'Neil (Carole Lombard), and Marion falls in love with Henry Morgan (Charles Starrett), an auto mechanic, the family tries to intervene to prevent their children from marrying beneath themselves.

Cast
 Miriam Hopkins as Marion Lenox
 Carole Lombard as Alice O'Neil
 Frank Morgan as Bronson Lenox
 Charles Starrett as Henry Morgan
 Henry Wadsworth as Bertie Lenox
 Winifred Harris as Carrie Lenox
 Herbert Yost as George Grafton
 David Hutcheson as Lord Rockingham
 Ilka Chase as Millie Montgomery
 Herschel Mayall as Judge Summers

A typographical error in the title cards for this film credited starlet Carol Lombard as Carole Lombard, a name she kept for the remainder of her career.

Production
David Gray and Avery Hopwood's play, The Best People, opened on Broadway on August 19, 1924 and ran for 142 performances.  (It was later revived in 1933 when it ran for a more modest 67 performances.) Hopwood was a prolific and successful playwright, many of whose plays were adapted into films – his 1919 play The Gold Diggers provided the template for the Warner Bros. series of movie musicals.

The Best People was made into a silent film in 1925, The Best People, before Paramount had it refashioned into a vehicle for Miriam Hopkins, an established Broadway star who had just signed with the studio after making the short subject The Home Girl for them in 1928. Fast and Loose was her second film appearance.

Fast and Loose was also Preston Sturges' second Hollywood assignment, after The Big Pond (and its French-language version La grande mare).  Carole Lombard, on the other hand, had appeared in over 40 films by the time Fast and Loose was released, all as "Carol Lombard."

References

External links
 
 
 
 
 lobby poster

1930 films
American black-and-white films
American films based on plays
Films directed by Fred C. Newmeyer
Paramount Pictures films
1930 romantic comedy films
American romantic comedy films
1930s English-language films
1930s American films